Ben and Mena Trott may refer to:

 Benjamin Trott
 Mena Grabowski Trott